Cady Huffman (born February 2, 1965) is an American actress.

Early life
Huffman was born in Santa Barbara, California, to Lorayne, a pre-school assistant director turned realtor, and Clifford Huffman, an attorney. She is the younger sister of actor Linus Huffman and automotive writer John Pearley Huffman, whose work often appears in Road & Track and Car and Driver magazines and The New York Times. She attended public schools in Santa Barbara (skipping the fourth grade) and graduated from the local San Marcos High School in June 1982. Huffman started performing in Santa Barbara's very active local theater community well before her teenage years. She also studied ballet at The Goleta School of Ballet and performed numerous classical ballets with the school's company.

Career
Huffman first came to Broadway as a replacement cast member in the hit musical La Cage aux Folles (1985), and was quickly cast in Bob Fosse's Big Deal, to be followed by a Tony-Award nomination for her performance in The Will Rogers Follies (1991). In 2001, she played the role of Ulla in the original cast of the Broadway musical The Producers, by Mel Brooks. Huffman received the Tony Award for Best Performance by a Featured Actress in a Musical for the role.

She made her film debut in the film Hero (1992). She has since appeared in Space Marines (1996),<ref>[http://www.tcm.com/tcmdb/title/477555/Space-Marines/full-credits.html ' "Space Marines Credits"] tcm.com, retrieved September 14, 2017</ref> Romance & Cigarettes and The Nanny Diaries. She also appeared in the 2010 film The Company Men. During 2003 and 2004, she produced, starred in and acted as production designer for the independent film Sunday on the Rocks directed by Joe Morton.

On television, she has had guest starring roles on programs such as Frasier, Law & Order: Criminal Intent and Mad About You. She appeared as herself in several guest spots on the television series Curb Your Enthusiasm during 2004. The series' fourth season plot involved Larry David joining the cast of The Producers. Beginning in August 2005, Huffman took over for Kimberlin Brown as Dr. Paige Miller on One Life to Live. Her last episode aired on January 23, 2006. During 2011 and 2012, she has appeared in episodes of The Good Wife.

She was a regular food judge on Food Network's Iron Chef America, described by host Alton Brown as "the Kitty Carlisle" of the series.

During July and August 2007, Huffman starred in the Off-Broadway play Surface to Air written by David Epstein and directed by James Naughton, in a rare dramatic part for the actress who usually appears on stage in musicals. In May 2009, she appeared in the new musical Pirates! in the Huntington Theatre Company, Boston, production. She appeared alongside The Producers co-star Nathan Lane in The Nance which opened on Broadway on April 15, 2013. She was nominated for a 2013 Outer Critics Circle Award for her work in that play. In 2014, she played a major role in the Off-Broadway rock musical Revolution in the Elbow of Ragnar Agnarsson Furniture Painter.

In July 2017 she directed City of Light'', a musical by Gabrielle Wagner, Julie Weiner and Jan Roper at the SheNYC Summer Theater Festival.

Personal life
She now lives in Brooklyn, New York City.

Filmography

Film

Television

Theatre

References

External links
 
 
 
 

Living people
American film actresses
American musical theatre actresses
American soap opera actresses
American television actresses
Actresses from Santa Barbara, California
People from Santa Barbara, California
Drama Desk Award winners
Tony Award winners
21st-century American women
Year of birth missing (living people)